The glenopolar angle (GPA) is a measure for the rotational malalignment of the glenoid about an anteroposterior (front-to-back) axis perpendicular to the scapular plane.

The glenopolar angle is defined as the angle between the line connecting the most cranial with the most caudal point of the glenoid cavity and the line connecting the most cranial of the glenoid cavity with the most caudal point of the scapular body.

A glenopolar angle ranging from 30° to 45° is considered normal. The glenopolar angle is mainly used within the field of scapular surgery (for example, due to a scapular neck fracture).

References
 Bestard, E.A. et al. (1986). "Glenoplasty in the management of recurrent shoulder dislocations". Contemporary Orthopaedics 12, 47.
 Romero, J. et al. (2001). "Scapular neck fracture - the influence of permanent malalignment of the glenoid neck on clinical outcome". Archives of Orthopaedic and Trauma Surgery 121, 313–316.

Skeletal system
Upper limb anatomy